Dollu is a 2022 Indian Kannada-language drama film written and directed by Sagar Puranik and produced by Pawan Wadeyar and Apeksha Purohit under the banner of Wadeeyar Movies. The film stars Karthik Mahesh, Nidhi Hegde, Chandra Mayura and Babu Hirannaiah.

Dollu was released on 26 August 2022 and was critically acclaimed. At the 68th National Film Awards, the film won two awards for Best Feature Film – Kannada and best audiography.

Plot 
Bhadra, a dollu kunitha artist, is torn between regrouping his Dollu team to keep the age-old traditions of his ancestors alive and fighting with his team members who are shifting to the city, as their art doesn’t provide enough remuneration.

Cast 

 Karthik Mahesh as Bhadra
 Nidhi Hegde as Priya
 Chandra Mayur as Kaalappa
 Babu Hirannaiah as Purohit
 Sharanya Suresh as Lachchi
 Dr. Prabhudeva D.S
 Gowtham
 Chandramanu K.G.R
 Gangadhar
 Ravikiran
 Nayana
 Chandrakala Sagara
 Varun Srinivas
 Gurumurthy Varadamula
 Vijayalakshmi
 Vishwanath

Soundtrack 
The music was composed by Ananth Kamath.

Reception

References

External links 

 
2020s Kannada-language films
Films set in Karnataka